Philip C. H. Chan was the Deputy President and Provost of the Hong Kong Polytechnic University (HKPU), who is currently Emeritus  Professor of Electrical and Electronic Engineering.

Before joining PolyU on 1 March 2010 he had been Chair Professor of the Department of Electronic and Computer Engineering at the Hong Kong University of Science and Technology since 1991, the year he entered the university as a founding member.

After Professor Timonthy Tong finished his term as HKPU President, he was appointed as interim President from 1 January 2019 to 30 June 2019. In 1 July, Professor Jin-Guang Teng assumed his post as President. Professor Chan continues to serve as Provost and Deputy President until 29 February 2020, and retired from HKPU.

Chan was born in Shanghai and then raised in Hong Kong.

References 

Living people
Year of birth missing (living people)
Heads of universities in Hong Kong
Academic staff of Hong Kong Polytechnic University
University of California, Davis alumni